Lynette Howell Taylor (born May 1979) is a British film producer for film and television.  She was co-nominated for the Academy Award for Best Picture for producing A Star Is Born (2018).  She founded the production company 51 Entertainment in 2017.  She also produced the 92nd Academy Awards with Stephanie Allain.

In addition to A Star Is Born, Howell Taylor also produced the films Stephanie Daley (2006), Half Nelson (2006), Phoebe in Wonderland (2008), The Greatest (2009), Blue Valentine (2010), The Place Beyond the Pines (2012), Big Eyes (2014), Captain Fantastic (2016) and The Accountant (2016).

Personal life
She was born on the Wirral and is a graduate of the Liverpool Institute for Performing Arts.

She resides in Los Angeles and is married to Graham Taylor.  She is the mother of two children.

Filmography

References

External links
 

British film producers
British expatriates in the United States
Alumni of the Liverpool Institute for Performing Arts
Living people

20th-century births
Year of birth uncertain